Taboga Island, also known as the "Island of Flowers", is a volcanic island in the Gulf of Panama.

History
The island was discovered in the 16th century and was originally named Isla de San Pedro by the Spanish explorer Vasco Núñez de Balboa. Its current name derives from an Indian word aboga ("many fish"). The island's first settlers were Indian slaves from Venezuela and Nicaragua. The small town of San Pedro was founded in 1524 by Hernando de Luque, dean of the Panama cathedral. The town church of the same name is claimed to be the second-oldest church in the hemisphere. Rose of Lima (1586–1617), the first Catholic saint of the Americas, may have been born on the island. The French painter Paul Gauguin visited the island in 1887.

Paul Gauguin in Taboga
Having worked for the first (French) attempt to dig a canal from the Caribbean Sea to the Pacific, an attempt in which 22,000 workers lost their life, the French painter Paul Gauguin, taken ill, was sent for treatment in Taboga Island. He then returned to France, with a stopover in Martinique, and then left for the Marquesas. His stay in Taboga is marked by an engraved plate on the island's main beach.

Geography
It is famous for its beautiful beaches, clear waters, soft sands and wildlife refuge.

Tourism
Tourism is the major economic activity on the island, although fishing and agriculture are also practiced. The island has become a popular touristic attraction due to its beautiful natural areas and its proximity to Panama City. Daily ferries link the city to the island, most of them departing from the Amador Causeway.

Apart from beaches, the island has trails for hiking to its highest points, including Cerro Vigía and Cerro de la Cruz. The latter is a hill located south of the town, topped with a huge cross. Many activities are available such as boat tours for fishing, whale watching, snorkeling, mountain tours and sightseeing, as well as walking and nature tours.

The Cementerio do Taboga (Cemetery of Taboga), the oldest cemetery on the island, hasdecorative headstones and graves.

References

External links 
 Taboga Island The Island Of Flowers
 Taboga Fire Brigade 
 Taboga Island
 Taboga Panamá (Spanish)

Pacific islands of Panama
Gulf of Panama
Panamá Province